Robert Montgomery Hamilton, 8th Lord Belhaven and Stenton, KT (1793 – 22 December 1868) was a Scottish peer and politician.

Background
Born at Wishaw House, he was the son of William Hamilton, 7th Lord Belhaven and Stenton, and Penelope Macdonald, youngest daughter of Ranald MacDonald of Clanranald. In 1814 he succeeded his father in the Lordship of Belhaven and Stenton.

Career
Hamilton sat on the Whig benches in the House of Lords as a Scottish Representative Peer between 1819 and 1832. The latter year he was created Baron Hamilton of Wishaw, in the County of Lanark, in the Peerage of the United Kingdom. This title gave him an automatic seat in the House of Lords. Hamilton also served as High Commissioner to the General Assembly and Kirk from 1831 to 1841, from 1847 to 1851, again from 1853 to 1857 and a last time from 1860 to 1866. Having been previously the county's vice-lord-lieutenant, he was appointed Lord Lieutenant of Lanarkshire in 1863, an office he held until his death five years later. In 1861, Hamilton was invested as a Knight of the Thistle. He is recorded as President of the Wodrow Society in 1845.

Family

He married Hamilton Campbell, daughter of Walter Frederick Campbell and Mary Nisbet, in 1815; they had no children. Hamilton died on 22 December 1868, aged 75 and was buried in Cambusnethan Kirkyard, where his large mausoleum still stands, although the kirk no longer exists. The kirkyard is located close to Wishaw, by the River Clyde. On his death, the barony of Hamilton of Wishaw became extinct while the lordship of Belhaven and Stenton became dormant.

References

1793 births
1868 deaths
Knights of the Thistle
Lords of Parliament
Lord-Lieutenants of Lanarkshire
Lords High Commissioner to the General Assembly of the Church of Scotland
Barons in the Peerage of the United Kingdom
Peers of the United Kingdom created by William IV